The Parañaque River, also known as Tambo River, is a river in Metro Manila in the Philippines. It is located south of Manila passing through Pasay and Parañaque located near Ninoy Aquino International Airport. The river exits Manila Bay between the barangays of Don Galo and La Huerta just north of the Parañaque Cathedral.

See also 
 List of rivers and esteros in Manila

External links
Image

Rivers of Metro Manila
Parañaque